Zeta Chi Phi Multicultural Sorority, Incorporated is a national multicultural sorority that was founded in San Antonio, Texas in 2003. It is also known as the Zetas.

History 
Zeta Chi Phi was founded at the University of Texas at San Antonio on January 30, 2003. It formed from a local group called Ladies for Diversity which had organized in January 2003. Its founders were Sneha Bandreddi, Marcia Davis, Amirah Saldivar-Smith, Claudia Sanchez, Janet Sapatu, Tran Tang, Maya Thomas, and Kayla Weed.

The sorority's founding pillars were multiculturalism, education, democracy, integrity, loveliness, and community service. It incorporated as the non-profit  Zeta Chi Phi Multicultural Sorority, Incorporated on February 10, 2003.

The Beta chapter was established at the Florida State University but has since gone inactive. The Gamma chapter was founded by eight women at Gustavus Adolphus College in St. Peter, Minnesota on December 4, 2004.

Symbols 
Zeta Chi Phi's colors are baby blue and black. Its flower is the plumeria and its jewel is the diamond. Its mascot is the black jaguar. The sorority's motto is "Nothing, absolutely nothing can stop a truly committed person."

Activities 
The sorority focuses on promoting cultural diversity and women in society. Its events include step shows, Zeta cafes, a national convention, and a Blue Diamond formal. It has also raised money for the People Helping People homeless shelter.

Chapters
Active chapters are indicated in bold. Inactive chapters are shown in italics.

References

Fraternities and sororities in the United States
Student organizations established in 2003
2003 establishments in Texas